Leonid S. Chekin is a Russian born writer and translator living and working in the United States. He is the author of "Northern Eurasia in Medieval Cartography", from
Brepols (2006) a guide to 198 Western European and Byzantine maps from between the eighth and ninth centuries.  The volume was first issued in Russia in 1998 as "Kartografia Khrisitianskogo Srednevekovia" (Vostochnaia literature, Moscow) In her review of the volume in Cambridge University Press Journal, Speculum:A Journal of Medieval Studies, Natalia Lozovsky states..."The author defines his focus as the lands that medieval
Western Europeans and Byzantines, following the Greco-Roman tradition, perceived as the edges of the known world".....

Chekin also penned "Mappa Mundi and Scandinavia" in the Journal for Scandinavian Studies published by the University of Illinois Press (1993).

References

Living people
Year of birth missing (living people)
Russian emigrants to the United States
Russian translators
20th-century American translators
21st-century American translators